Malcolm Donald McGillivray (28 August 1929 – 7 November 1984) was an Australian rules footballer who played with Essendon in the Victorian Football League (VFL). He won a reserves premiership in his only season with Essendon. McGillivray the played for Echuca for three years before returning to his original club, Gunbower, as captain-coach in 1954. He won a premiership in his first season back with Gunbower and played with them until retiring in 1963.

McGillivray worked as a grazier.

Notes

External links 

Essendon Football Club past player profile

1929 births
1984 deaths
Australian rules footballers from Victoria (Australia)
Essendon Football Club players
Echuca Football Club players